= Kangwon Domin Ilbo =

Regional newspaper of South Korea

- Publisher: Kim Jung-seok
- Editor: Kyeong Min-hyeon
- Founded: November 26, 1992
- Language: Korean
- Headquarters: 22, Huseok-ro 462beon-gil, Chuncheon, Gangwon Province, South Korea
- Website: www.kado.net

Kangwon Domin Ilbo (Korean: 강원도민일보) is a regional newspaper of Gangwon Province, South Korea. It was founded on November 26, 1992 by 50 people who resigned from Kangwon Ilbo. As of 2013, its circulation is around 41,800 copies.

== Awards hosted ==
Kangwon Domin Ilbo co-hosts Geumgang National Middle School Football Tournament with the Korea Football Association. It also co-hosts Gyeongpo Marathon with Gangneung Athletics Federation.

It has hosted Kim Yu-jeong Literary Contest since 1993.

It has co-hosted Gangwon SME Awards with Gangwon Province since 1997 to recognize and support outstanding small and medium enterprises in the province.

== Awards received ==
Award	Year	Category	Work	Reporter(s)	Ref.
Editor of the Year Award	2022	-	Funjip Shop	Editorial Team	
Korea Newspaper Award	2025	News & Investigative reporting	Frontline Troops Entered Yanggu County Office at Dawn on the Day of the December 3 Martial Law Declaration	Park Jae-hyeok	
Korea Newspaper Award	2022	News & Investigative reporting	Controversy over Budget Waste by the Gangwon Office of Education	Oh Se-hyeon, Jung Min-yeop, Jung Seung-hwan	
Korea Newspaper Award	2015	News & Investigative reporting	IOC Recommendation for the Decentralized Hosting of the PyeongChang Olympics	Song Jeong-rok, Ahn Eun-bok, Jin Min-su, Kim Yeo-jin	

== External link ==
- Official website
